Pueblo Terror is a 1931 American pre-Code
Western film directed by Alan James and starring Jay Wilsey, Jack Harvey and Wanda Hawley.

Cast
 Jay Wilsey as Bill Sommers 
 Jack Harvey as John Weston 
 Wanda Hawley as Helen Weston 
 James P. Spencer as Pedro 
 Aline Goodwin as Martha Morgan 
 Art Mix as Buck Peters 
 Yakima Canutt as Ballen, crooked Foreman 
 Horace B. Carpenter as Sheriff 
 Al Ferguson as Henchman Al 
 Hank Bell as Henchman Hank 
 Robert D. Walker as Bob Morgan

Plot
A war veteran (Sommers) returns encounters a land-grab scheme when he returns home. The culprit (John Weston) denies the existence of such a plan and diverts attention when he blames Sommers for the murder of a rancher. Sommers eventually uncovers the truth and proves his innocence. The film was the second of five starring Buffalo Bill, Jr. (Wilsey), all of which were based on stories written by Canutt.

References

Bibliography
 Michael R. Pitts. Poverty Row Studios, 1929–1940: An Illustrated History of 55 Independent Film Companies, with a Filmography for Each. McFarland & Company, 2005.

External links
 
 

1931 films
1931 Western (genre) films
American Western (genre) films
Films directed by Alan James
1930s English-language films
1930s American films